The Bhatt Prabhu Brahmin (commonly known as Parabhu in Konkani) community belongs to the Panch Darvida category of Brahmins, and claims to be a sub-caste of the Karhade Brahmin community.

History
It is said that certain Padye families were excommunicated for some reason during the 14th or 15th century, which led to the formation of a new community known as the Bhatt Prabhus. But unlike Padyes they did not migrate to any other state and chose to remain in Goa.

References

Other  sources
"Goa", By Kumar Suresh Singh, Pra. Pā Śiroḍakara, H. K. Mandal, Anthropological Survey of India,Page:249
"A socio-cultural history of Goa from the Bhojas to the Vijayanagara " By Vithal Raghavendra Mitragotri

Brahmin communities of Goa
Konkani
Social groups of Maharashtra
Social groups of Karnataka